Vikas Gupta (born 7 May 1988) is an Indian television producer, creative director, screenwriter and host. He is known for participating in Bigg Boss 11 , Bigg Boss 14 and hosting MTV Ace of Space.

Life
Gupta was born on 7 May 1988. He hails from Dehradun. His brother, Siddharth Gupta, is an actor as well as a model.

In June 2020, Gupta came out as bisexual in an Instagram post. Gupta is also one of the directors of an NGO called Lost Boy Welfare Association that helps poor children.

Career
Gupta started working at the age of 17 in Balaji Telefilms as an actor He was the creative head of Ekta Kapoor’s Balaji Telefilms for shows like Mahabharat, Kyunki Saas Bhi Kabhi Bahu Thi, Kis Desh Mein Hai Meraa Dil and Pyaar Tune Kya Kiya. Later, he started his own production studio Lost Boy Productions which has created popular television series like Gumrah: End of Innocence, Warrior High, Kaisi Yeh Yaariaan, V The Serial, Yeh Hai Aashiqui and MTV Webbed. Gupta has also been the youngest programming head of MTV India.

In October 2017, Gupta participated in Colors TV's Bigg Boss 11 where he emerged as the second runner up of the season. Due to his performance, he was given the title of “Mastermind” on the show. In 2017, he produced Class of 2017 on ALTBalaji.

In 2018, he hosted IIFA Buzz in Thailand for IIFA Awards 2018 on Voot. Gupta also created and hosted his own reality show titled Ace of Space on MTV India.

In 2019 he played Bigg Boss 13  As a proxy

In 2019, he participated in Colors TV's Fear Factor: Khatron Ke Khiladi 9 in Argentina. He was disqualified from the show Next, he created Puncch Beat for on ALT Balaji. In March, he reunited with his co-contestants Bharti Singh, Aly Goni, Harsh Limbachiyaa among others to be a part of Khatra Khatra Khatra. In May 2019, Gupta created anthology series Yeh Ishq Nahi Aasaan for Dangal TV. In August 2019, he returned as the host of MTV India's Ace of Space 2.

In February 2020, he created Class of 2020 for ALTBalaji. In November, he participated in Colors TV's Bigg Boss 14, this time as a challenger. When co-contestant Arshi Khan involved Gupta's family in a fight, he pushed her and was thus expelled from the show. He re-entered the show soon after.

Filmography

Television

Web series 
 2017: Class of 2017
 2019: Puncch Beat
 2020: Class of 2020

Television

Awards

References

External links 

Living people
1988 births
Indian television producers
Bisexual men
Indian bisexual people
LGBT television producers
Indian LGBT screenwriters
Indian LGBT entertainers
Bigg Boss (Hindi TV series) contestants
Fear Factor: Khatron Ke Khiladi participants